Pittsfield is an unincorporated community located in Brown and Shawano counties, Wisconsin, United States. The Brown County portion of Pittsfield is in the town of Pittsfield, while the Shawano County portion is in the town of Maple Grove.

References

Unincorporated communities in Brown County, Wisconsin
Unincorporated communities in Shawano County, Wisconsin
Unincorporated communities in Wisconsin